Justus Ferdinand Poggenburg II (December 10, 1865 – December 31, 1916 or January 1, 1917) was a New York City billiards champion. He was known as the "father of amateur billiards". The Poggenburg Memorial Billiards Trophy Cup awarded by the National Association of Amateur Billiard Players is named in his honor.

Biography
He was born on December 10, 1865, to Justus Ferdinand Poggenburg I (1840–1893), the botanist. He was the father of Justus Ferdinand Poggenburg III. He died in January 1917.

References

1865 births
1917 deaths
American pool players